Fantasy Boys is an upcoming South Korean reality competition show created by MBC. It is scheduled for release on MBC TV on March 30, 2023, and will air every Thursday at 22:00 (KST).

Concept 
The show is a global project for the birth of a talented K-pop boy group composed of trainees from around the world.

In June 2022, Funky Studio announced the production of the male version of "After School Excitement" and started meetings with 53 entertainment agencies. The production company also added that the debut of the new boy group will simultaneously carry out games and webtoon characters, games, digital contents, and NFT (Non-Fungible Token) issuance projects.

In July 2022, auditions were held and more than 1,000 trainees from all over the world, including Japan, China, the United States, Thailand, etc. have applied. Then from November 18 to December 31, 2022, contestants were recruited for all boys aged 14 and over regardless of nationality.

Promotion and broadcast 
The second season of the "After School Excitement" series, which is the sequel to the girl group survival audition program My Teenage Girl broadcast from 2021 to 2022.

In November 2022, the program title was confirmed as Fantasy Boys, and multiple teaser videos were released.

In February 2023, the 55 contestants' profile photos and videos were released on official website and SNS accounts. The show production announced on 23rd that it will hold an offline event entitled 'Hi! Fantasy' on March 1 at COEX to meet the contestants ahead of the first broadcast. The signal song "FANTASY" music video was released on the 27th.

In March 2023, the 'Hi! Fantasy' offline event was held at COEX and the contestants did various activities with the fans. It was confirmed that more than 5,000 applicants globally applied for the event proving the popularity of Fantasy Boys.

Cast 
Host: Changmin

Homeroom Teachers (also known as Mentors):
 Jang Wooyoung
 Jeon So-yeon
 Jin-young
 Kang Seung-yoon

Rap Teachers:
Hanhae
Kebee

Vocal Teachers:
Jin-young
Park Su-min
Jeong Woong-min

Dance Teachers:
Yoo Kwang-yeol
Lee Kwang-taek

Contestants 

The English names of Korean and Chinese contestants are presented in Eastern order according to the official website while Japanese contestants' names are presented in Western order. The English spelling of contestants' names are taken from their official profiles.

For American, Chinese, Japanese and Thai contestants, their Korean names are listed along with their respective languages' names.

Color Key

Discography

Singles

Notes

References

External links 
  
 Fantasy Boys at Naver 
 Fantasy Boys at Naver NOW 

Fantasy Boys
MBC TV original programming
2023 South Korean television series debuts
K-pop television series
Korean-language television shows
Music competitions in South Korea
South Korean reality television series